Great Coates railway station serves the village of Great Coates in North East Lincolnshire, England. It was built by the Great Grimsby and Sheffield Junction Railway in 1848. The station, and all trains serving it, are operated by East Midlands Railway.

Services
All services at Great Coates are operated by East Midlands Railway using Class 156 DMUs.

There is a Sunday service of four trains per day in each direction during the summer months only. There are no winter Sunday services at the station.

Services were previously operated by Northern Trains but transferred to East Midlands Railway as part of the May 2021 timetable changes.

References

External links 

Railway stations in the Borough of North East Lincolnshire
DfT Category F2 stations
Former Great Central Railway stations
Railway stations in Great Britain opened in 1848
Railway stations served by East Midlands Railway
Former Northern franchise railway stations